The FIFA World Cup, sometimes called the Football World Cup or the Soccer World Cup, but usually referred to simply as the World Cup, is an international association football competition contested by the men's national teams of the members of Fédération Internationale de Football Association (FIFA), the sport's global governing body. The championship has been awarded every four years since the first tournament in 1930, except in 1942 and 1946, due to World War II.

The tournament consists of two parts, the qualification phase and the final phase (officially called the World Cup Finals). The qualification phase, which currently take place over the three years preceding the Finals, is used to determine which teams qualify for the Finals. The current format of the Finals involves 32 teams competing for the title, at venues within the host nation (or nations) over a period of about a month. The World Cup Finals is the most widely viewed sporting event in the world, with an estimated 715.1 million people watching the 2006 tournament final.

Iceland made its debut at the FIFA World Cup in 2018 after having failed 12 consecutive qualification campaigns from 1974 to 2014. The nation first attempted to qualify for the tournament back in 1958.

The 2018 FIFA World Cup was Iceland's second major international tournament, having also qualified for UEFA Euro 2016.

Iceland is the smallest nation to reach the World Cup Group Stage, breaking the record set by Trinidad and Tobago.

Record at the FIFA World Cup

*Draws include knockout matches decided via penalty shoot-out.

Russia 2018

Following a 2–0 home win over Kosovo in the final round of the qualifiers, Iceland secured their spot in Russia 2018, finishing top of Group I by two points over Croatia, who had defeated Iceland in the World Cup play-offs four years earlier. Despite finishing bottom of the group, Iceland drew against Argentina 1–1 in the opening match of the group.

Group stage

Players with most appearances
Nine players were fielded in all three of Iceland's FIFA World Cup matches in 2018.

Goalscorers
In the match against Argentina on 16 June 2018, Alfreð Finnbogason scored the first goal for Iceland in FIFA World Cup history.

See also

 Iceland at the UEFA European Championship

References

External links
 Iceland at FIFA.com

 
Countries at the FIFA World Cup
Iceland national football team